The Secesh River is a  tributary of the South Fork Salmon River in Idaho and Valley Counties, Idaho in the United States. The river begins at the confluence of Lake Creek and Summit Creek near the unincorporated community of Burgdorf and flows generally southeast, through Secesh Meadows and a series of canyons, emptying into the South Fork near Browns Camp.

The river drains a remote wilderness watershed in the Salmon River Mountains. Situated in the Payette National Forest, it is a popular destination for whitewater boating, and its confluence with the South Fork also marks the beginning of the South Fork's main whitewater run.

See also
List of rivers of Idaho

References

Rivers of Idaho
Rivers of Idaho County, Idaho
Rivers of Valley County, Idaho